Depramine (INN; GP-31,406), also known as balipramine (BAN) and as 10,11-dehydroimipramine, is a tricyclic antidepressant (TCA) which was never marketed.

See also 
 Tricyclic antidepressant

References 

Dimethylamino compounds
Dibenzazepines
Tricyclic antidepressants
Abandoned drugs